Witherspoon Cottage is a historic cure cottage in Saranac Lake, Franklin County, New York.  It was built about 1910 as a boarding house and is a -story, square frame dwelling in the Queen Anne style. The gable roof has hipped roof dormers. It features two cure porches; one above the verandah and a second supported by four posts and spanning two-thirds of the northwest facade.

It was listed on the National Register of Historic Places in 1992.

References

Houses on the National Register of Historic Places in New York (state)
Queen Anne architecture in New York (state)
Houses completed in 1910
Houses in Franklin County, New York
National Register of Historic Places in Franklin County, New York